Coleophora brunneipennis is a moth of the family Coleophoridae. It is found in the United States, including Ohio.

References

brunneipennis
Moths described in 1921
Moths of North America